Henryk Ruder was a Polish engineer, a long-time head and member of Warsaw-based Road Network Planning Bureau and member of the board of the "Autostrady Polskie" think-tank. A specialist in road and motorway network development, he co-authored the plan of Polish motorways network, most notably the location of A1, A2 and A4. He authored numerous works on road construction and development. In 1998 Ruder was posthumously awarded with Officer's Cross of Polonia Restituta.

References

Polish engineers
Year of death missing
Year of birth missing